The 1986–87 Algerian Championnat National was the 25th season of the Algerian Championnat National since its establishment in 1962. A total of 20 teams contested the league, with JE Tizi-Ouzou as the defending champions, The Championnat started on 29 August, 1986 and ended on 5 June, 1987.

Team summaries

Promotion and relegation 
Teams promoted from Algerian Division 2 1986–1987 
 Flambeau de Skikda
 Jeunesse de Tiaret
 Union d'Alger

Teams relegated to Algerian Division 2 1987–1988
 GCR Mascara
 ESM Guelma
 CM Constantine
 MC Saïda
 WO Boufarik

League table

References

External links
1986–87 Algerian Championnat National

Algerian Championnat National
Championnat National
Algerian Ligue Professionnelle 1 seasons